A Representative Concentration Pathway (RCP) is a greenhouse gas concentration (not emissions) trajectory adopted by the IPCC. Four pathways were used for climate modeling and research for the IPCC fifth Assessment Report (AR5) in 2014. The pathways describe different climate futures, all of which are considered possible depending on the volume of greenhouse gases (GHG) emitted in the years to come. The RCPs – originally RCP2.6, RCP4.5, RCP6, and RCP8.5 – are labelled after a possible range of radiative forcing values in the year 2100 (2.6, 4.5, 6, and 8.5 W/m2, respectively). Since AR5 the original pathways are being considered together with Shared Socioeconomic Pathways: as are new RCPs such as RCP1.9, RCP3.4 and RCP7.

Concentrations
The RCPs are consistent with a wide range of possible changes in future anthropogenic (i.e., human) GHG emissions, and aim to represent their atmospheric concentrations.  Despite characterizing RCPs in terms of inputs, a key change from the 2007 to the 2014 IPCC report is that the RCPs ignore the carbon cycle by focusing on concentrations of greenhouse gases, not greenhouse gas inputs. The IPCC studies the carbon cycle separately, predicting higher ocean uptake of carbon corresponding to higher concentration pathways, but land carbon uptake is much more uncertain due to the combined effect of climate change and land use changes.

The four RCPs are consistent with certain socio-economic assumptions but are being substituted with the shared socioeconomic pathways which are anticipated to provide flexible descriptions of possible futures within each RCP. The RCP scenarios superseded the Special Report on Emissions Scenarios projections published in 2000 and were based on similar socio-economic models.

RCPs

RCP 1.9
RCP 1.9 is a pathway that limits global warming to below 1.5 °C, the aspirational goal of the Paris Agreement.

RCP 2.6
RCP 2.6 is a "very stringent" pathway.
According to the IPCC, RCP 2.6 requires that carbon dioxide emissions start declining by 2020 and go to zero by 2100. It also requires that methane emissions go to approximately half the  levels of 2020, and that sulphur dioxide (SO2) emissions decline to approximately 10% of those of 1980–1990. Like all the other RCPs, RCP 2.6 requires negative  emissions (such as  absorption by trees). RCP 2.6 is likely to keep global temperature rise below 2 °C by 2100.

RCP 3.4

RCP 3.4 represents an intermediate pathway between the "very stringent" RCP2.6 and less stringent mitigation efforts associated with RCP4.5. As well as just providing another option a variant of RCP3.4 includes considerable removal of greenhouse gases from the atmosphere.

A 2021 paper suggests that the most plausible projections of cumulative  emissions (having a 0.1% or 0.3% tolerance with historical accuracy) tend to suggest that RCP 3.4 (3.4 W/m^2, 2.0–2.4 degrees Celsius warming by 2100 according to study) is the most plausible pathway.

RCP 4.5
RCP 4.5 is described by the IPCC as an intermediate scenario. Emissions in RCP 4.5 peak around 2040, then decline. According to resource specialists IPCC emission scenarios are biased towards exaggerated availability of fossil fuels reserves; RCP 4.5 is the most probable baseline scenario (no climate policies) taking into account the exhaustible character of non-renewable fuels.

According to the IPCC, RCP 4.5 requires that carbon dioxide emissions start declining by approximately 2045 to reach roughly half of the levels of 2050 by 2100. It also requires that methane emissions stop increasing by 2050 and decline somewhat to about 75% of the  levels of 2040, and that sulphur dioxide (SO2) emissions decline to approximately 20% of those of 1980–1990. Like all the other RCPs, RCP 4.5 requires negative  emissions (such as  absorption by trees). RCP 4.5 is more likely than not to result in global temperature rise between 2 °C and 3 °C, by 2100 with a mean sea level rise 35% higher than that of RCP 2.6. Many plant and animal species will be unable to adapt to the effects of RCP 4.5 and higher RCPs.

RCP 6
In RCP 6, emissions peak around 2080, then decline. The RCP 6.0 scenario uses a high greenhouse gas emission rate and is a stabilisation scenario where total radiative forcing is stabilised after 2100 by employment of a range of technologies and strategies for reducing greenhouse gas emissions. 6.0 W/m2 refers to the radiative forcing reached by 2100 Projections for temperature according to RCP 6.0 include continuous global warming through 2100 where CO2 levels rise to 670 ppm by 2100 making the global temperature rise by about 3–4 °C by 2100.

RCP 7
RCP7 is a baseline outcome rather than a mitigation target.

RCP 8.5
In RCP 8.5 emissions continue to rise throughout the 21st century. Since AR5 this has been thought to be very unlikely, but still possible as feedbacks are not well understood. RCP8.5, generally taken as the basis for worst-case climate change scenarios, was based on what proved to be overestimation of projected coal outputs. It is still used for predicting mid-century (and earlier) emissions based on current and stated policies.

Projections based on the RCPs

21st century
Mid- and late-21st century (2046–2065 and 2081–2100 averages, respectively) projections of global warming and global mean sea level rise from the IPCC Fifth Assessment Report (IPCC AR5 WG1) are tabulated below. The projections are relative to temperatures and sea levels in the late-20th to early-21st centuries (1986–2005 average). Temperature projections can be converted to a reference period of 1850–1900 or 1980–99 by adding 0.61 or 0.11 °C, respectively.

Across all RCPs, global mean temperature is projected to rise by 0.3 to 4.8 °C by the late 21st century.

According to a 2021 study in which plausible AR5 and SSP scenarios of  emissions are selected,

Across all RCPs, global mean sea level is projected to rise by 0.26 to 0.82 m by the late-21st century.

23rd century
AR5 also projects changes in climate beyond the 21st century. The extended RCP2.6 pathway assumes sustained net negative anthropogenic GHG emissions after the year 2070. "Negative emissions" means that in total, humans absorb more GHGs from the atmosphere than they release. The extended RCP8.5 pathway assumes continued anthropogenic GHG emissions after 2100. In the extended RCP 2.6 pathway, atmospheric CO2 concentrations reach around 360 ppmv by 2300, while in the extended RCP8.5 pathway, CO2 concentrations reach around 2000 ppmv in 2250, which is nearly seven times the pre-industrial level.

For the extended RCP2.6 scenario, global warming of 0.0 to 1.2 °C is projected for the late-23rd century (2281–2300 average), relative to 1986–2005. For the extended RCP8.5, global warming of 3.0 to 12.6 °C is projected over the same time period.

Up to 2500
In 2021, researchers who found that projecting effects of greenhouse gas emissions only for dates up to 2100 – as widely practiced in research and policy-making – is short-sighted modelled RCP climate change scenarios and their effects for dates up to 2500.

See also
 Coupled Model Intercomparison Project
 Shared Socioeconomic Pathways

References

Note: The following references are cited in this article using Template:Harvard citation no brackets:

 . [Archived

.

External links 
 Special Issue: The representative concentration pathways: an overview, Climatic Change, Volume 109, Issue 1–2, November 2011. Most papers in this issue are freely accessible.
 The Guardian: A guide to the IPCC's new RCP emissions pathways
 G.P. Wayne: The Beginner's Guide to Representative Concentration Pathways
 Jubb, I., Canadell, P. and Dix, M. 2013. Representative Concentration Pathways: Australian Climate Change Science Program Information paper

Climate change assessment and attribution
Intergovernmental Panel on Climate Change
Greenhouse gas emissions